The black-backed water tyrant (Fluvicola albiventer) is a species of bird in the family Tyrannidae, the tyrant flycatchers. It is one of three species in the genus Fluvicola.

It is found in South America in central and northeastern Brazil and south through Bolivia, Paraguay, northern Argentina and Uruguay; also eastern Peru.
Its natural habitat is swamps.

This tyrant is a striking bright-white and black bird.

Range: Amazon Basin, Caatinga, Cerrado, to Argentina

The black-backed water tyrant is a resident breeder in the southeast Amazon Basin, a range that continues east through the Caatinga to the Brazil coast, and only inland, south through the Cerrado to eastern Bolivia, central and western Paraguay, and northern Argentina, and ending at the South Atlantic coast, ranging into only southern Uruguay.

The northern range-limit in the Amazon Basin is the Amazon River strip; in the southwestern Amazon Basin, into Amazonian eastern Peru and northern Bolivia, the black-backed water tyrant is a migrating non-breeder. In Peru, the north-flowing Ucayali River is its western limit, and at the Amazon River's outlet in the northeast, the bird ranges into southern portions of Brazil's Amapá state.

Gallery

References

External links
"Black-backed water tyrant" videos on the Internet Bird Collection
Black-backed water tyrant photo gallery VIREO Photo-High Res
Photo-High Res; Article geometer—"Brazil Photos"

black-backed water tyrant
Birds of Brazil
Birds of Bolivia
Birds of Paraguay
Birds of Argentina
Birds of Uruguay
Birds of the Cerrado
Birds of the Caatinga
black-backed water tyrant
Taxonomy articles created by Polbot